Viviana is a 1916 American short drama film directed by  B. Reeves Eason.

Cast
 Sylvia Ashton
 Marion Christie
 George Periolat
 Leslie Reed
 Vivian Rich

External links

1916 films
1916 drama films
1916 short films
Silent American drama films
American silent short films
American black-and-white films
Films directed by B. Reeves Eason
1910s American films